The 2013–14 Maltese Premier League was the 99th season of the Maltese Premier League, the top-tier football league in Malta. It began on 16 August 2013 and ended on 26 April 2014. Birkirkara are the defending champions, having won their 4th title the previous season.

The Premier League consisted of two rounds. In the First Round, every team played each opponent twice, once "home" and once "away" (in actuality, the designation of home and away were purely arbitrary as most of the clubs did not have their own grounds), for a total of 22 games. The league then split into two pools. Earned points are subsequently halved. Teams that finished in the positions 1–6 competed in the "Top Six" and teams that finished in positions 7–12 played in the "Play-out".

Teams

Relegation and promotion 
Ħamrun Spartans and Melita were relegated finishing 11th and 12th, respectively, in the previous season.

Promoted were, Naxxar Lions and Vittoriosa Stars finishing 1st and 2nd, respectively, in the First Division the previous season.

Venues

Locations

First phase

League table

Results

Second phase

Top Six

Play-out

Top goalscorer

References

External links 
 Premier League official page
 UEFA website
 Soccerway Malta page

Maltese Premier League seasons
Mal
1